Polystichum vestitum, commonly known as the prickly shield fern or pūnui (Maori), is a hardy, evergreen or semi-evergreen ground fern.

Description
Polystichum vestitum  is a terrestrial fern with an erect and scaly rhizome, sometimes forming a short trunk and growing up to 700 mm in height.  The fronds are 220–600 mm long.  There are 3–7 (usually 5) round sori on each pinnule, halfway between the margin and midrib, with a light brown indusium. The ferns are usually bicolour with a dark brown centre that is surrounded by margins that are a pale brown. On the ferns found on the Chatham Islands and the Islands south of New Zealand (Stewart Island and the Sub Antarctic Island) the dark brown centre can be reduced making it less obvious.

Distribution
The fern is native to the three principal islands of New Zealand (North Island, South Island and Stewart Island) and the Chatham Islands, as well as to New Zealand's subantarctic Snares, Antipodes, Auckland and Campbell Islands, and to Australia’s Macquarie Island.

New Zealand range
The Prickly Shield Fern is found on the North and South Island of New Zealand, however it is not very common north of Auckland or the Coromandel Peninsula in the North Island.

Macquarie Island
On Macquarie it dominates the fernbrake communities which typically occur on the eastern, leeward side of the island on valley slopes and sheltered valley floors.  Although it can form dense stands in which few other plants will grow, more commonly it is found in conjunction with Stilbocarpa polaris, Poa foliosa and Pleurophyllum hookeri.  The fern is seriously affected by rabbit grazing.

Habitat
Polystichum vestitum on the North Island is often found covering the hillsides and at higher altitudes where the climate is colder, while on the South Island it can be found in a more various range of places such as both coastal and alpine regions and at lower altitudes. Polystichum vestitum is common in the more exposed landscapes such as gulley floors, forest margins and tussock grasslands, but can also be found in abundance in the more cooler and wetter forests.

Life cycle/phenology
Polystichum vestitum, just like all other ferns, are non-flowering plants and cannot therefore produce seed. Instead, ferns reproduce with the spores they are carrying on the underside of their fronds. When springtime arrives, the green fern fronds uncoil and uncurl and stretches up. On the underside of the frond, tiny green bumps start to appear and are soon turning brown. These spots are called "sori" and consist of masses of spore cases, called sporangia. On Polystichum vestitum the spores are monolete and bilaterally symmetrical located which gives them unique identification. When the spores are ripe, the sporangia is torn apart and the light-weighted spores are carried away with the wind. The spore can remain fertile for many years and go on a journey for hundreds of kilometers. For the spores to be able to start growing, it must fall into wet ground. A spore that falls into dry land, will never begin to grow, since it needs to absorb water. Once the spore has settled down it can start absorbing water through osmosis, which enables swelling and bursting of the outer walls of the spore and the growing tissue can be released. The one spore cell can now divide into two and continue to develop into a small heart-shaped object called ‘prothallus’, which looks very similar to a liverwort and can therefore be mistaken for it. On the underside of the prothallus, the male reproductive organs are located, while the female ones are at the top. The male sex organs are called antheridia and the female ones are called archegonia. When the sperm and the egg has matured and there is enough moisture on the prothallus, the antheridia release the spermatozoa which is attracted by the scent coming from the ripened egg and swims towards it to fertilize it. Once fertilized, the cell can divide and the new baby fern starts to grow with help from the prothallus, which supports it with nutrients. After a while when the fern has established its own root system and can continue growing on its own, the prothallus dies. A new life cycle can now begin when the fern grows towards maturity.

Diet/prey/predators

Diet and foraging
The Prickly Shield Fern prefers soil that is free draining (does not get waterlogged) and is fertile enriched with humus. The fern can survive in a wide range of environmental conditions. It prefers areas with more rainfall and can survive in temperature below 0oc however in these conditions the ferns are more often found under the forest canopy where it will be a bit warmer. It prefers wetter areas and is why it can often be found in gully's however it does like the soil to be free draining rather than waterlogged.

Predators, parasites, and diseases
On the underside of the fronds in silk tunnels, the tiny caterpillar of the "puniu spore-eater" moth can be found living and eating the spores from the fern. There are also caterpillars from the "pale fern looper" and "zigzag fern looper" moth that feed on the fronds. The plant is also favored by deer and possums. In general, aphids, brown fern scale, caterpillars, mealy bug, slugs and snails are the most commonly parasites to attack ferns. Other problems and diseases could be acid rot, algae, fungus diseases and moulding.

Other information
The Prickly Shield Fern is in a large abundance and its current conservation status is not threatened and has been for the past 14 years. 
The etymology of Polystichum comes from the Greek words polus and stikhos, which can be translated as "many rows" and can be referred to the parallel rows of spore cases on the underside of the fronds. Vestitum has its origins from the Latin vestire and means "clothed", which denotes from the dense cover of the scales on its leaf stalks.

References

Notes

Sources
 
 
 
 

vestitum
Ferns of New Zealand
Ferns of Australia
Flora of the Antipodes Islands
Flora of the Auckland Islands
Flora of the Chatham Islands
Flora of Macquarie Island
Snares Islands / Tini Heke
Flora of the Campbell Islands
Taxa named by Carl Borivoj Presl
Plants described in 1836